Girardi and Keese or Girardi & Keese was a Los Angeles-based law firm. It was founded in 1965 by lawyers Thomas Girardi and Robert Keese. It served clients in California in a variety of legal areas. It was known for representing plaintiffs against major corporations. Chapter 7 Bankruptcy petitions were filed by creditors against the firm in December 2020 and it was defunct by January 2021.

Anderson, et al. v. Pacific Gas & Electric

One of the firm's best known cases was against Pacific Gas & Electric (PG&E). Residents of the desert community Hinkley, California blamed incidents of cancer and other diseases on contaminated water leaked from a gas pumping station owned and operated by PG&E. The utility company agreed to pay $460 million to 650 residents. This case was the inspiration for the film Erin Brockovich (2000) starring Julia Roberts. “That particular case revolutionized people’s thinking about all the toxic things they are exposed to,” Girardi told Attorney at Law magazine.

In 2019, PG&E counter-sued the Law Finance Group, which sued partner Thomas Girardi for funds that were borrowed on behalf of clients. The litigation funder's lawyer said the loan agreement states the loan was to Girardi and his firm.

Chapter 7 bankruptcy
Two Chapter 7 involuntary bankruptcy petitions were filed in December 2020, and no one from the firm, including Girardi, appeared before U.S. Bankruptcy Judge Barry Russell at the first bankruptcy hearing in January 2021 to "discuss the future of his personal assets and those of his Los Angeles firm, Girardi Keese." In April 2021, it was announced that Tom Girardi's law office will be sold.

References

Law firms based in Los Angeles
1965 establishments in California
Law firms established in 1965